Pyrga is a village in the Famagusta District of Cyprus, located 22 west of Famagusta on the main Nicosia-Famagusta highway. It is under the de facto control of Northern Cyprus. Today most of the village is used by the Turkish military as a military base.

References

Communities in Famagusta District
Populated places in Gazimağusa District